William A. Paterson (October 3, 1838 – September 8, 1921) was born in Canada in 1838 and arrived in Flint, Michigan in 1868. He established the W. A. Paterson Company, a carriage-manufacturer. One of the original stockholders of Buick Motor Company, he entered the automobile business for himself and marketed the Paterson automobile (1908 to 1923).

From 1891 to 1892 he served as mayor of the City of Flint.  He was also involved in founding the Union Trust Savings Bank.

Paterson built a new office on the corner of S. Saginaw and Third Streets.  The Paterson Building still stands today.  The building, now owned by the Collison family, has been maintained to reflect its beautiful glory, rich in art deco, inside and out.

See also
William A. Paterson Factory Complex
The Patterson Building
Patterson (automobile)

References

1838 births
1921 deaths
Mayors of Flint, Michigan
Burials at Glenwood Cemetery (Flint, Michigan)
19th-century American politicians